Rhadinoloricaria macromystax is a species of catfish in the family Loricariidae and the genus Rhadinoloricaria. The genus was monotypic until 2020, when a new species, R. stewarti, was described.

Rhadinoloricaria macromystax is native to Ecuador and Peru, where it occurs in the upper Amazon and Orinoco River basins, as well as the Essequibo and Tocantins drainages. It is known to occur over sandy substrates. The species reaches a length of 14.2 centimetres (5.6 in) in standard length. It is relatively unknown and uncommon in museum collections, and ecological and behavioral data is unavailable for this species.

References 

Loricariidae
Taxa named by Albert Günther
Fish described in 1869